Torsten Lennart Samuelsson (7 July 1924 – 27 November 2012) was a Swedish association footballer who played as a defender and won bronze medals at the 1950 FIFA World Cup and 1952 Summer Olympics.

Between 1950 and 1955 Samuelsson capped 36 international matches an scored no goals. Domestically he played for Elfsborg (126 matches, 2 goals in 1947–1954), and in 1951 he appeared in nine matches with the French club Nice. His career was cut short due to a broken leg. He later coached IFK Luleå, IK Brage and Örebro SK.

References

External links

 
 Swedish Olympic Committee

1924 births
2012 deaths
Association football defenders
Swedish footballers
Sweden international footballers
IF Elfsborg players
Ligue 1 players
OGC Nice players
1950 FIFA World Cup players
Footballers at the 1952 Summer Olympics
Olympic bronze medalists for Sweden
Olympic footballers of Sweden
Swedish football managers
Örebro SK managers
IK Brage managers
Expatriate footballers in France
Olympic medalists in football
Medalists at the 1952 Summer Olympics
People from Borås
Sportspeople from Västra Götaland County